Hnat Stefaniv (2 May 1895 – 21 June 1949) was a colonel of the Ukrainian Galician Army and the army of the Ukrainian People's Republic. Born in the village of Toporivtsi near Horodenka, Stefaniv rose to the rank of major in the Austro-Hungarian army. In the November retreat of 1918, he was the organizer and commandant of the Zolochiv area in the Western Ukrainian National Republic. In 1918, he was elevated to the rank of colonel and commanded the Ukrainian Army in Lwów. Under his leadership, the Ukrainian forces fought the Polish forces in Lwów, but after the arrival of reinforcements were forced to leave the city November 22. Later he joined the army of the UNR where he commanded the Hutsul regiment, the additional brigade of the rifleman's division and the commander of the cavalry in the First Winter Campaign. In 1920 he became the commander in exile of the Ukrainian armies. In 1920 he went over with a group under General Anton Kraus to Czechoslovakia and there headed the diplomatic mission of the West Ukrainian People's Republic in Uzhhorod. Until 1939 he lived in Transcarpathia, then in Vienna, and from 1944 - in Germany, where he died.

Sources 
 Volodymyr Kubiyovych (editor-in-chief), Encyclopedia of Ukraine

1895 births
1949 deaths
People from Ivano-Frankivsk Oblast
People from the Kingdom of Galicia and Lodomeria
20th-century Ukrainian people
Austro-Hungarian Army officers
Ukrainian military personnel
Ukrainian Galician Army people
Austro-Hungarian military personnel of World War I
Ukrainian people of the Polish–Ukrainian War
Ukrainian expatriates in Germany
Czechoslovak emigrants to Germany